Oryza australiensis is a wild rice species native to northern Australia. It is a perennial plant that uses the C3 photosynthesis pathway.

References

australiensis
Poales of Australia
Endemic flora of Australia